Rory Underwood,  (born 19 June 1963) is an English former rugby union player, he is 's record international try scorer with 49 tries in 85 internationals between 1984 and 1996. Underwood's principal position was wing and he played 236 games for Leicester Tigers between 1983 and 1997, he also played for Middlesbrough, Bedford Blues and the Royal Air Force. Underwood toured with the British and Irish Lions in 1989 and 1993 playing in six tests and scoring one try. In 1992 Underwood played for England alongside his younger brother Tony Underwood, becoming the first brothers to play together for England since 1937.

Playing during the amateur era his profession was as a Royal Air Force pilot.

Early life
Underwood was born in Middlesbrough, England, of Chinese-English parentage. His father was a Yorkshire engineer who worked in Malaysia where he met and married Underwood's Chinese-Malaysian mother.

Underwood was educated at Barnard Castle School (with fellow rugby international Rob Andrew and infamous MI6 officer Richard Tomlinson), followed by initial officer training at RAF College Cranwell.

Underwood's early life was spent in Malaysia. His family moved to Yorkshire in 1976, but his father was posted to Singapore and did not rejoin the family for another three years.

Royal Air Force
In the Royal Air Force (RAF), Underwood played for the Strike Command and main RAF rugby team. As flying officer he flew with No. 360 Squadron RAF, an electronic countermeasures training squadron, on Canberras at RAF Wyton in Cambridgeshire. He then flew the Hawk with No. 100 Squadron RAF, also at Wyton.

Underwood took a ground-instruction job in 1995 at RAF Cranwell, becoming a flight lieutenant, while playing for Leicester. He became station flight safety officer, then joined No. 55 Squadron RAF (navigator training, now referred to as a weapon systems officer) on the twin-engined Dominie (British Aerospace 125), and continued in the RAF until 1999, although he could have stayed until 2001.

Rugby
Having first played as a youngster at Middlesbrough Rugby Club (with Rob Andrew and Bernie Coyne), Underwood went on to become one of the greatest wings in rugby union. Underwood is the leading try scorer for England in international matches. He first played for England in February 1984 against Ireland at Twickenham. He won 85 England and 6 Lions caps between 1984 and 1996 (then an English record, later surpassed by Jason Leonard – it remained the highest total for an English back, though that has since been overtaken by Jonny Wilkinson), scoring a record 49 tries for England, and 1 for the British Lions, making him one of the leading try scorers of all time. He played for England in the Rugby World Cups of 1987, 1991 and 1995.

Underwood was capable of playing on either right or left wing depending on who was selected on the opposite side. More usually seen on the left wearing shirt number 11, in 1988 he switched to the right (and shirt number 14) to accommodate Chris Oti: in 1990 on the right opposite Mark Bailey, but on the left when partnering Simon Halliday, continuing on the left in 1991 opposite Nigel Heslop: in the 1991 World Cup he played on the right in partnership with Oti early on, then on the left in partnership with Heslop until the quarter-final and Halliday for the final two rounds, an arrangement that persisted throughout the 1992 Five Nations championship – which was initially billed as his final season before retirement, Underwood scoring tries in each of the first three matches of the championship, and coming close to scoring against Wales. However, Underwood changed his mind and opted to carry on, initially for the next match against South Africa (their first match since their readmission to international sport), and eventually for several more years – playing mostly now on the left, to accommodate his younger brother, Tony, on the right wing.  They were the first brothers to represent England at the same time since 1937: and, in the 1993 match against Scotland, the first pair of brothers to score tries in the same match for England. He has been described as one of the greatest wingers to ever play the game.

Recent career
Underwood has worked as a management consultant. When leaving the RAF he planned on setting up a company called Teamwork with his friend John Peters. He planned on acquiring a Commercial Pilot Licence.

Underwood set up UPH, a management and teamwork training company, with John Peters and Martyn Helliwell on 20 May 1999. Two years later, he appeared on Lily Savage's Blankety Blank.

Like John Peters, Underwood is also a motivational speaker. He held a role as a non-executive director on the board of Leicester Tigers F.C, but left this role in November 2020. His new company is called Wingman Ltd.

International tries

Personal life
Underwood's wife was an air traffic controller in the RAF. He has two daughters. He has two younger brothers, Gary and Tony, and also has a sister, Wendy. His brother Tony Underwood became a commercial pilot after retiring and also played rugby for England and has two daughters.

Underwood's long-lasting relationship with the RAF was put under strain when his wife was unfairly dismissed from the RAF for being pregnant, for which she received £13,000 in a compensation claim in 1995.

Underwood lives in a small village near Grantham in Lincolnshire, having lived in the area for many years whilst at Cranwell. He has often been invited to be a local dignitary, or to play for local charity sports matches. He is President of the Grantham National Malaya and Borneo Veterans Association.

Publications
 Flying Wing – An Autobiography by Rory Underwood, 1992,

See also
 List of leading rugby union test try scorers
 List of top English points scorers and try scorers
 List of rugby union test caps leaders

References

External links
 Sporting heroes
 

1963 births
Military personnel from Yorkshire
Living people
Bedford Blues players
British & Irish Lions rugby union players from England
British sportspeople of Chinese descent 
Combined Services rugby union players
Deputy Lieutenants of Leicestershire
England international rugby union players
English people of Chinese descent
English people of Malaysian descent
English rugby union players
Graduates of the Royal Air Force College Cranwell
Leicester Tigers players
Members of the Order of the British Empire
People educated at Barnard Castle School
Royal Air Force officers
Royal Air Force rugby union players
Rugby union players from Middlesbrough
Rugby union wings
Yorkshire County RFU players